The Muir Trestle, or Alhambra Trestle, is a railway trestle bridge in Martinez, California located within the John Muir National Historic Site. It is owned and operated by BNSF Railway and carries their Stockton Subdivision.

History
In 1897, for the sum of $10 in gold, John Muir and Louisa Muir ceded a right of way to the San Francisco and San Joaquin Valley Railroad. The agreement describes the land upon which a trestle bridge was to be located: through a pear orchard. The span was completed in 1899. A passenger station was located at the eastern approach.

Design
The trestle is of steel construction resting on concrete piers, carrying a single set of railroad tracks. The western approach feeds directly into the line's  Tunnel Number 4.

References

BNSF Railway bridges
Martinez, California
Railroad bridges in California
Bridges completed in 1899
Trestle bridges in the United States
Bridges in Contra Costa County, California